Johann Kogler (born 12 May 1968) is an Austrian football manager and former player who played as a midfielder or defender. He made seven appearances for the Austria national team from 1994 to 1995.

References

External links
 
 

1968 births
Living people
People from Judenburg
Austrian footballers
Association football midfielders
Association football defenders
Austria international footballers
Austrian Football Bundesliga players
2. Bundesliga players
Grazer AK players
SK Vorwärts Steyr players
FC Admira Wacker Mödling players
LASK players
SpVgg Greuther Fürth players
SW Bregenz players
SC Austria Lustenau players
Austrian football managers
Footballers from Styria